4 Play (Reissued in Nollywood as 4 can Play by De-Kross Movies for international distribution) is a 2010 Nigerian Ghanaian romantic blue comedy film directed by Frank Rajah Arase, starring Majid Michel, Yvonne Okoro, John Dumelo, Jackie Appiah, Roselyn Ngissah and Juliet Ibrahim. The film is followed by a sequel titled 4Play Reloaded, released in 2011. It received 3 nominations at the 2010 Ghana Movie Awards and eventually won the award for Best Actress in a Leading Role.

Cast
Majid Michel as Alvin
John Dumelo as Rex
Jackie Appiah as Jezel
Yvonne Okoro as Ruby
Juliet Ibrahim as Nivera
Roselyn Ngissah as Angie
Jesse Sarpong as Kojo
Kalsum Sinare as Jezel's mum
Omar Sherif Captain as Jake
Roger Quartey as Barrister Dickson

Plot

Things were going well between Ruby and her ife until anonymous caller hint her of jayke's infidelity.it turns out her husband has a gay partner.

Reception 
modernghana.com commended the acting and directing of the film.

References

2010 films
Nigerian comedy films
2010 direct-to-video films
2010 romantic comedy films
Ghanaian comedy films
2010s English-language films
English-language Nigerian films
English-language Ghanaian films
2010s romantic comedy-drama films